Slapy Hydro Power Plant is a large power plant in the Czech Republic that has four turbines with a nominal capacity of 36 MW each having a total capacity of 144 MW.

External links

Hydroelectric power stations in the Czech Republic